AAON Inc. designs, manufactures and sells semi-custom heating, ventilation and air conditioning equipment (HVAC) for commercial and residential use.

AAON Inc. was founded by Norm Asbjornson in 1987, when he purchased the air conditioning and heating division of John Zink. Asbjornson became both founding president and CEO. As of 2021, AAON employed 2,881 people combined at its headquarters in Tulsa, Oklahoma and secondary locations in Longview, Texas and Kansas City, Missouri. AAON Inc. had around $535 million net sales in 2021.

The company broke ground on a new R&D lab in Tulsa on February 25, 2016. At the time, AAON was also expanding its manufacturing facility nearby. The research lab cost US$33 million and opened in October 2019.

Its subsidiary, AAON Coil Products manufactures a variety of heating/cooling products, as well as coils used in the heating, ventilation, and air conditioning (HVAC) industry and provides coils to AAON and other customers.

See also
List of companies based in Tulsa, Oklahoma
 List of S&P 600 companies

References

External links
Official Website
UVC Air Purifier

Companies based in Tulsa, Oklahoma
Heating, ventilation, and air conditioning companies
Companies listed on the Nasdaq
American companies established in 1988
American brands